The 2002 United States House of Representatives elections in Oregon were held on November 5, 2002 to select Oregon's representatives to the United States House of Representatives. All five seats were up for election in 2002, as they are every two years. All five incumbents were re-elected, four of them by large margins; only the 5th district was somewhat competitive.

Overview

District 1

Candidates

Results

District 2

Candidates

Results

District 3

Candidates

Results

District 4

Candidates

Results

District 5

Candidates

Results

See also
 United States House of Representatives elections, 2002
 United States Senate election in Oregon, 2002
 Oregon gubernatorial election, 2002

References

2004
Oregon
House